Ata is the anglicized form of several names in several languages around the world.

 In Turkish, Ata is a masculine given name meaning "Forefather".
 In Hebrew, Ata means "you".
 In Ogba, Ata means “child”.
 In Arabic,  is a name meaning "Gift". It also appears in Persian.
 In Fante, Ata means "one of twins".

Ata, Atta, or Ataa may refer more specifically to:

First element of compound name
Ataullah, Arabic, meaning gift of God
Ata-ur-Rahman, Arabic, meaning gift of the Most Merciful

Given name

Turkish 
 Ata Bozaci (born 1974), Swiss graphic designer, illustrator and artist of Turkish descent
 Ata Demirer (born 1972), Turkish stand-up comedian and actor

Hungarian 
 Ata Kandó (1913–2017), Hungarian photographer

Arabic 
 Ata-Malik Juvayni (1226–1283), Iranian historian
 Ata al-Ayyubi (1877–1951), Ottoman-Arab civil servant
 Ata Abu Rashta (born 1943), Islamic jurist, scholar and writer
 Ata Nahai (born 1960), Kurdish Iranian novelist
 Atta Muhammad Nur (born 1965), Afghan governor
 Ata Yamrali (born 1982), German-Afghan  footballer
 Ataa Jaber (born 1993), Israeli-Arab footballer
 Ata al-Khadim (ʿAṭā al-Khādim;  century), governor of Baalbek and viceroy of Damascus
 Ata ibn Haffaz al-Sulami (ʿAṭā ibn Ḥaffāẓ al-Sulamī;  century), eunuch and vizier of the emirate of Damascus
Abu Ghitrif Atta, an 8th-century Yemeni Arab, father of al-Khayzuran and Salsal.

Fante 
 Ataa Oko (1919–2012), Ghanaian sculptor and artist

Surname

Turkish 
 Üsküplü Ata (died after 1533), Ottoman poet
 Mustafa Kemal Atatürk (1881-1938), Turkish military leader and statesman, founder of Turkiye. Atatürk was an honorary name.
 Ayla Akat Ata (born 1976), Turkish politician of Kurdish descent

Arabic 
 Wasil ibn Ata (700–748), Islamic scholar
 Mahmoud Mahmoud Atta (born 1954), American-Arab militant
 Shahla Ata (1959–2015), Afghan politician and congresswoman
 Mohamed Atta (1968–2001), Egyptian Islamist, ringleader of the hijackers of American Airlines Flight 11 in the September 11 attacks
 Walid Atta (born 1986), Swedish footballer
 Al-Khayzuran bint Atta, wife of Abbasid caliph al-Mahdi.
 Salsal bint Atta, mother of Arab princess Zubaidah bint Ja'far.

Common name
 Ata is the commonly-abbreviated name for the Atacama skeleton, the six-inch long remains of a human with major genetic abnormalities that was discovered in 2003

References

Arabic-language surnames
Arabic masculine given names
Turkish-language surnames
Turkish masculine given names